Mordellistena degressa is a beetle in the genus Mordellistena of the family Mordellidae. It was described in 1917 by George Charles Champion.

References

degressa
Beetles described in 1917